The 2008 Southend-on-Sea Council election took place on 1 May 2008 to elect members of Southend-on-Sea Unitary Council in Essex, England. One third of the council was up for election and the Conservative party stayed in overall control of the council.

After the election, the composition of the council was
Conservative 27
Liberal Democrat 11
Independent 7
Labour 6

Campaign
Before the election the Conservatives ran the council with 29 seats, compared to 10 for the Liberal Democrats, 7 Labour and 5 independents. The election was seen as being the closest for years with the other parties needing to gain 4 seats from the Conservatives to deprive them of a majority.

There was a record number of candidates in the election, with St Luke's ward having 7 candidates and the British National Party putting up candidates in every ward for the first time.

Election result
Overall turnout in the election was 34%.

Ward results

References

2008
2008 English local elections
2000s in Essex